Dalugama is a suburb of Colombo city, situated North-East of the Colombo city centre fort, the capital of Sri Lanka. It is a fast developing administrative, commercial and residential area in the Colombo District. According to the 2010 Department of Census and Statistics estimate, it is a populous suburb of Colombo city, with an average population of 74,428.

See also
List of towns in Western Province, Sri Lanka

References

External links 
Detailed map of Dalugama by Maplandia

Populated places in Western Province, Sri Lanka